formerly known as  and Universal, is a Japanese manufacturer of pachinko, slot machines, arcade games and other gaming products, and a publisher of video games. Aruze possesses licenses to both manufacture and distribute casino machines in the American states of Nevada, Mississippi and New Jersey. The company's corporate headquarters are in Tokyo. Aruze is also the licence holder of the video game franchise Shadow Hearts. Up until February 18, 2012, the company owned approximately 21% of Wynn Resorts. On November 1, 2009, Aruze Corporation changed its name to Universal Entertainment Corporation due to financial difficulties.

Universal
Universal Lease Co., Ltd was established in December 1969. It later changed its name to Universal Ltd in Japan. Universal Distributing Company opened as an american subsidiary to sell video games direct to operators, and was later named Universal USA.

They initially earned success with arcade video games that cloned popular arcade games. Scratch (1977) was a Breakout clone that became the third highest-earning arcade video game of 1977 in Japan, just below Speed Race DX and Breakout. Scratch was again Japan's fourth highest-earning arcade video game of 1978. Cosmic Monsters (1978) was a Space Invaders clone that became Japan's sixth highest-earning arcade video game the same year.

Universal eventually moved away from clones and began producing original arcade games.  (1978) was a sit-down arcade racing game that used a 16-bit central processing unit (CPU), for which it was advertised as the world's first 16-bit game; it was among Japan's top twenty highest-earning arcade video games of 1978.

Universal followed with the hugely influential platform game Space Panic (1980) and the maze game Lady Bug (1981). Universal's greatest hit game was Mr. Do! (1982), which spawned three sequels in the eventual Mr. Do series: Mr. Do's Castle, Mr. Do's Wild Ride and Do Run Run. Cashing-in on the success of laserdisc video games, Universal released Super Don Quix-ote in 1984, on a new standardized laserdisc video game system they called the Universal System 1. A new game was planned every six months for the Universal System 1, including an unreleased laserdisc adventure game based on Mr. Do!, but the company stopped producing arcade games in 1985, and Super Don Quix-ote ended up being the only game released for the system. Universal Distributing of Nevada (UDN) was established to begin selling Universal's first slot machines direct to the gaming industry.

Several Universal titles were designed by Kazutoshi Ueda, most notably Mr. Do! (1982). He later left Universal and went on to work at Tehkan (now Tecmo), then became a co-founder of Atlus, where he worked on the Megami Tensei series. Ueda's work at Universal inspired the game design style of Tehkan's Michitaka Tsuruta, who went on to create Guzzler (1983), Bomb Jack (1984), Solomon's Key (1986), and the Captain Tsubasa game series.

In January 2005, the company became a wholly owned subsidiary of Aruze. Aruze Corporation changed its company name to Universal Entertainment Corporation effective November 1, 2009.

On February 2, 2023, Aruze announced that they had officially filed for Chapter 11 bankruptcy protection in the United States.

Relationship with SNK

In 2000, Aruze bought out SNK Corporation, maker of the Neo Geo. In exchange for the use of SNK's popular characters on their pachinko and slot machines, and a few games for the Neo-Geo, Aruze promised financial backing for the failing SNK. Instead Aruze instituted a program to liquidate SNK's assets and cut costs. This included licensing out popular IP to other companies (such as Metal Slug series, The King of Fighters series and Sengoku series), closing underperforming divisions, discontinuing distribution outside Japan, ending support for the Neo Geo arcade platform and selling off warehoused inventory. By 2001 it was clear to many SNK's employees that Aruze was not planning to preserve SNK and was simply going to let the company implode after liquidating most of its useful assets. So Eikichi Kawasaki and many other executives from SNK left to form Playmore in August 2001. Over this period many rank and file employees left to join other arcade developers or form their own companies.

In October 2001, Aruze allowed SNK to file for bankruptcy and all of its assets went up for bidding. Kawasaki's Playmore stepped in and bought up most of the auctioned assets and set itself up to re-enter the video game market as the successor to SNK. Playmore also acquired some of the companies formed by ex-SNK employees, namely Brezzasoft and Noise Factory, to jumpstart development of more titles for the Neo Geo arcade system. Playmore quickly went about re-establishing themselves in the market; they opened new branches in North America and Europe, announced development of new titles for the Neo Geo arcade system, started developing games for console and portable systems for the first time in years and re-established distribution channels to sell inventory for the Neo Geo home and pocket systems. To further establish themselves as a reborn SNK they officially changed their name to SNK Playmore in 2003.

In October 2002, Aruze was sued by SNK Playmore founder Eikichi Kawasaki for copyright infringement over SNK's intellectual properties, claiming their use was unauthorized by Playmore. In January 2004, a preliminary decision was handed down by the Osaka District Court favoring SNK Playmore and was awarded 5.64 billion yen (US$57,627,468) in damages.

Notable games released by Universal
Scratch (1977)
Cosmic Monsters (1978)
Get A Way (1978)
Cosmic Alien (1979)
Space Panic (1980)
No Man's Land (1980)
Lady Bug (1981)
Mr. Do! (1982)
Eggs (1983)
Mr. Do's Castle aka Mr. Do vs Unicorns (1983)
Mr. Do's Wild Ride (1984)
Do! Run Run (1984)
Jumping Jack (1984)
Super Don Quix-ote (1984)
Captain Zap (1985)

List of games published by Aruze

Notes

References

External links
 

Amusement companies of Japan
Gambling companies of Japan
Companies based in Tokyo
Slot machine manufacturers
Video game companies of Japan
Entertainment companies established in 1969
Japanese brands
Companies listed on the Tokyo Stock Exchange
Companies that filed for Chapter 11 bankruptcy in 2023